Alexander Sergeyevich Esenin-Volpin (also written Ésénine-Volpine and Yessenin-Volpin in his French and English publications; ; May 12, 1924March 16, 2016) was a Russian-American poet and mathematician.

A dissident, political prisoner and a leader of the Soviet human rights movement, he spent a total of six years incarcerated and repressed by the Soviet authorities in psikhushkas and exile. In mathematics, he is known for his foundational role in ultrafinitism.

Life 
Alexander Volpin was born on May 12, 1924, in the Soviet Union. His mother, Nadezhda Volpin, was a poet and translator from French and English. His father was Sergei Yesenin, a celebrated Russian poet, who never knew his son. Alexander and his mother moved from Leningrad to Moscow in 1933.

His first psychiatric imprisonments took place in 1949 for "anti-Soviet poetry", in 1959 for smuggling abroad samizdat, including his Свободный философский трактат (Free Philosophical Tractate), and again in 1968.

Esenin-Volpin graduated from Moscow State University with a “candidate” dissertation in mathematics in the spring of 1949. After graduation, Volpin was sent to the Ukrainian city of Chernovtsy to teach mathematics at the local state university. Less than a month after his arrival in Chernovtsy he was  arrested by the MGB, sent on a plane back to Moscow, and incarcerated in the Lubyanka prison. He was charged with "systematically conducting anti-Soviet agitation, writing anti-Soviet poems, and reading them to acquaintances."

Apprehensive about the prospect of prison and labor camp, Volpin faked a suicide attempt in order to initiate a psychiatric evaluation. Psychiatrists at Moscow's Serbsky Institute declared Volpin mentally incompetent, and in October 1949 he was transferred to the Leningrad Psychiatric Prison Hospital for an indefinite stay. A year later he was abruptly released from the prison hospital, and sentenced to five years exile in the Kazakh town of Karaganda as a "socially dangerous element." In Karagada, he found employment as a teacher of evening and correspondence courses in mathematics.

In 1953, after the death of Joseph Stalin, Volpin was released due to a general amnesty. Soon he became a known mathematician specializing in the fields of ultrafinitism and intuitionism.

The Glasnost demonstration

In 1965, Esenin-Volpin organized a legendary "glasnost meeting" ("митинг гласности"), a demonstration at Pushkin Square in the center of Moscow demanding an open and fair trial for the arrested writers Andrei Sinyavsky and Yuli Daniel. The leaflets written by Volpin and distributed through samizdat asserted that the accusations and their closed-door trial were in violation of the 1936 Soviet Constitution and the more recent RSFSR Criminal Procedural Code.

The meeting was attended by about 200 people, many of whom turned out to be KGB operatives. The slogans read: "Требуем гласности суда над Синявским и Даниэлем" (We demand an open trial for Sinyavski and Daniel) and "Уважайте советскую конституцию" (Respect the Soviet constitution). The demonstrators were promptly arrested.

In the following years, Esenin-Volpin became an important voice in the human rights movement in the Soviet Union. He was one of the first Soviet dissidents who took on a "legalist" strategy of dissent. He proclaimed that it is possible and necessary to defend human rights by strictly observing the law, and in turn demand that the authorities observe the formally guaranteed rights. Esenin-Volpin was again hospitalized in February 1968 as one of those protesting most strongly against the trial of Alexander Ginzburg and Yury Galanskov (Galanskov-Ginzburg trial).

After his 1968 psychiatric confinement, 99 Soviet mathematicians sent a letter to the Soviet authorities asking for his release. This fact became public and the Voice of America conducted a broadcast on the topic; Esenin-Volpin was released almost immediately thereafter. Vladimir Bukovsky was quoted as saying that Volpin's diagnosis was "pathological honesty".

In 1968, Esenin-Volpin circulated his famous "Памятка для тех, кому предстоят допросы" (Memo for those who expect to be interrogated) widely used by fellow dissidents.

In 1969, he signed the first Appeal to The UN Committee for Human Rights, drafted by the Initiative Group for the Defense of Human Rights in the USSR. In 1970, Volpin joined the Committee on Human Rights in the USSR and worked with Yuri Orlov, Andrei Sakharov and other activists.

Emigration

In May 1972, he emigrated to the United States, but his Soviet citizenship was not revoked as was customary at the time. He worked at Boston University. In 1973 he was one of the signers of the Humanist Manifesto.

Abroad he again alarmed the Soviet authorities in 1977 by threatening to sue them for spreading rumours that he was mentally ill.

In 2005, Esenin-Volpin participated in "They Chose Freedom", a four-part television documentary on the history of the Soviet dissident movement.

He died on March 16, 2016, aged 91.

Mathematical work

His early work was in general topology, where he introduced Esenin-Volpin's theorem. Most of his later work was on the foundations of mathematics, where he introduced ultrafinitism, an extreme form of constructive mathematics that casts doubt on the existence of not only infinite sets, but even of large integers such as 1012.

Mathematical publications

 Reviewed by 
 Reviewed by

References

Further reading

External links
 Great Russian Poet's Son Comes Home at MN
 
 Robert Horvath, The Legacy of Soviet Dissent: Dissidents, Democratisation and Radical Nationalism in Russia, Taylor & Francis, 2005,  ; pp. 55, 85, 155

Russian language links
 Bio & Bibliography
 Bio & writings at Anthology of Samizdat
 Poetry

Audio-visual material
 

1924 births
2016 deaths
20th-century Russian mathematicians
Moscow State University alumni
20th-century American mathematicians
Soviet logicians
Writers from Saint Petersburg
Writers from Moscow
American people of Russian descent
Soviet emigrants to the United States
Russian male poets
Boston University faculty
Soviet dissidents
Soviet human rights activists
21st-century American mathematicians